National Road 52 (Swedish: Riksväg 52) is a Swedish national road in eastern Sweden between Nyköping and Kumla, through Katrineholm. The length of the road is approximately 130 km (88.7 mi).

The road is a rural highway with two lanes along the entire route.

References 

 

National road 52